Sribu is an online marketplace that connects clients who need graphic design services to a community of designers. Founded in 2011, its headquarters are located in Jakarta, Indonesia.

History
Sribu was founded in September 2011 by CEO Ryan Gondokusumo and CTO Wenes Kusnadi. Sribu.com is the first product from PT Sribu Digital Kreatif.Initially the website only served clients in Indonesia but in August 2012 Gondokusumo announced that his platform was going worldwide and could now be used all over the world.

Description
In 2012, PT Digital Sribu Creative received its seed funding from East Ventures. In 2013 it received further investment from Infoteria. Sribu collects 10 percent of the payment to the independent professionals. No fee is charged to those create content.

Awards
 Indonesia ICT Awards 2013
 SparxUp Award 2011

See also
 Shiftgig

References

External links
 

Companies based in Jakarta
Companies established in 2011
Online marketplaces of Indonesia
Indonesian brands
Freelance marketplace websites